The Dibër Valley (Debar) is a section of the Drin valley in the border region between North Macedonia and Albania.

The high-altitude valley is surrounded by even higher mountains on all sides: to the north is the Korab range, containing Mount Korab which, at 2764 metres, is the highest point in both countries; the mountains on the other sides also exceed 2000 metres. The Black Drin flows from the south through a narrow canyon into the valley and leaves it through a similarly steep canyon. Previously the river was notorious for annual floods, as a result of which there are no settlements near the river itself. Since the construction of a reservoir on the Macedonian side, the Debar Lake, the level of the river is regulated.

The Dibër Valley is fertile. Wolves and bears are still found in the large forests of the valley. A large portion of the inhabitants work in agriculture. 

After the collapse of the Ottoman Empire in Europe, the European great powers established the borders of the new Balkan states at the London Conference of 1912–13. As a result, the Dibër Valley was cut in half. The northwestern part, also known as the Little Dibër, was assigned to Albania. The Big Dibër, around the city of Debar, went to the Kingdom of Serbia. The city thus lost a large part of its hinterland. Families were separated and the inhabitants of the Albanian state were no longer able to visit the market in Debar. On the Albanian side, the city of Peshkopi became the new regional centre, the capital of the modern Dibër County and Dibër municipality.

The majority of Dibër's inhabitants are Albanians, who speak a Gheg dialect and are traditionally Muslim. There is a Macedonian Slav minority on both sides of the border.

External links
 Dibra.org

Geography of North Macedonia
Geography of Dibër County
Valleys of Europe
Albanian ethnographic regions